Thierry Neuville and Nicolas Gilsoul were the rally winners. Their team, Hyundai Shell Mobis WRT, were the manufacturers' winners.

Entry list

Classification

Event standings

Special stages

Power Stage 
The Power Stage was a  stage at the end of the rally.

Championship standings after the rally

Drivers' Championship standings

Manufacturers' Championship standings

References

External links
 
 The official website of the World Rally Championship

2017
2017 World Rally Championship season
2017 in French motorsport
April 2017 sports events in France